Manash Mukherjee is an Indian politician of political party Communist Party of India (Marxist) and former Member of West Bengal Legislative Assembly from 2001 to 2011 and 2016 to 2021, representing Kamarhati (Vidhan Sabha constituency).

References

Living people
Year of birth missing (living people)
People from North 24 Parganas district
West Bengal MLAs 2001–2006
West Bengal MLAs 2006–2011
West Bengal MLAs 2016–2021
Communist Party of India (Marxist) politicians from West Bengal